The Association of Panamerican Athletics (APA; Spanish: Asociación Panamericana de Atletismo) is a new regional confederation governing body of athletics for national governing bodies and multi-national federations within Northern, Central, and South America, and the Caribbean, replacing the Pan American Athletics Commission.

The organization was founded on October 28, 2011, during the XVI Pan American Games in Guadalajara, Jalisco, Mexico. The inaugural president is Víctor López from Puerto Rico, former president of the Central American and Caribbean Athletic Confederation (CACAC).

Championships 
APA organizes the following championships and cups:

Pan American Junior Championships
Pan American Youth Championships
Pan American Marathon Championships
Pan American Cross Country Cup
Pan American Combined Events Cup
Pan American Race Walking Cup

Member associations 
Due to the constitution, membership in the Association shall consist of World Athletics member federations which are affiliated members of NACAC and CONSUDATLE as ratified by World Athletics. At this time, APA consists of 44 member federations,  31 of them are member of NACAC, while 13 are member of CONSUDATLE.  This means that the APA also comprises the 3 IAAF members without a recognized National Olympic Committee that are therefore no member of the Pan American Sports Organization namely Anguilla, Montserrat, and the Turks and Caicos Islands.

See also
 North American, Central American and Caribbean Athletic Association (NACAC)
 South American Athletics Confederation (CONSUDATLE)
 Central American and Caribbean Athletic Confederation (CACAC)
 Central American Isthmus Athletic Confederation (CADICA)

References

External links 
 

National members of the International Association of Athletics Federations
Athletics organizations
Athletics
Ath
Ath
Ath
Ath
Sports organizations established in 2011